The regal horned lizard (Phrynosoma solare) is a horned lizard species native to Mexico and the Southwest United States.

Description
The regal horned lizard is a small, flat lizard about the size of the palm of a man's hand. Though it has spikes all around its body, the regal horn's main defense is the ability to squirt blood from its eyes.
 3–4 inches or 117 mm in length from nose to tail as a full adult.
 Pale grey to yellow-brown or reddish topped with dark blotches alongside the body and back.
 4 legs each leg with 5 toes and claws on each toe.
 Slow runner that uses camouflage to escape predators.

Distribution
This lizard can be found across southeastern Arizona and along the transition of the southern zone of the central mountains region.

Habitat
This horned lizard occupies primarily level or gently sloping terrain with openly spaced desert vegetation such as mesquite, creosote bush, and saguaro cactus. It can be found primarily in a hot and dry climate where the Earth may be covered in limestone dust. It is found in the Sonoran Desert Mountains is where it prefers its climate, but can be found in Texas, southern California, Arizona, and New Mexico.

Diet
They eat mostly harvester ants, and can eat twenty-five hundred ants in one meal. They are slow eaters, because they spend most of their time in the  intense heat of the desert during meals. They eat flies, spiders, and a variety of insects.

Behavior
This is a year-round active type of lizard, but during winter, its activity is usually restricted to unseasonably warm days. They may hibernate late September through October. The lizard basks in the sun with only its head poking out of the sand. The blood is heated within a chamber inside the head. When the blood is hot enough, the reptile opens a valve in its neck and circulates the blood around the body. It looks for shelter from cold temperatures by digging holes in the ground. When it is threatened or captured, it squirts blood from its eye. This blood may have a taste used to deter predators. If the camouflage and intimidation does not work, that is when they squirt out blood aiming for the predators mouth and eyes. This stream can range up to 4 feet and may be repeated several times. The stream comes out through its lower eyelids' pores. Some other defensive behaviors include gulping air and poking with the horns.

Reproduction
Mating for the regal horned lizard begins in late April, peaks in June, and stops abruptly in July. Egg laying starts a few weeks later, usually in late July and early August. About 10–30 eggs are laid (15 on average). The eggs are laid in the sand and are required to stay there for several weeks. The egg shells are white and flexible and average about one-half inch in diameter. The hatch-lings receive no parental care upon hatching and immediately bury themselves in the sand. They are now responsible for finding and hunting for their own food. Several diverting tactics are used to attract a mate, such as: head bopping, push ups, and nodding of the head.

References

External links

 Photos at reptilesofaz.org
 Desertusa.com

Regal horned lizard
Reptiles of Mexico
Reptiles of the United States
Fauna of the Western United States
Reptiles described in 1845
Taxa named by John Edward Gray